Unorganized Mainland Manitoulin is a former unorganized area in the Canadian province of Ontario, encompassing the small mainland portion of the Manitoulin District which was not part of the municipality of Killarney. It was dissolved and annexed into Killarney in 2006.

It comprised the geographic townships of Carlyle and Humboldt, as well as the unpopulated Indian reserve of Point Grondine. The only named settlement within the division is the ghost town of Collins Inlet.

There were a total of nine private dwellings, mostly for seasonal use and one of which was occupied. It had no population in the 2001 census, while there were two persons living in the area in 1996.

References

Manitoulin Mainland
Geography of Manitoulin District